John Cameron Lowrie was the first American Presbyterian missionary in India.

References 

1808 births
1900 deaths
People from Butler, Pennsylvania
American Presbyterian missionaries
Presbyterian missionaries in Pakistan
Presbyterian missionaries in India